Saint-Félix-de-Bourdeilles (literally Saint-Félix of Bourdeilles; Limousin: Sent Feliç de Maruèlh) is a commune in the Dordogne department in Nouvelle-Aquitaine in southwestern France.

Population

See also
Communes of the Dordogne department

References

Communes of Dordogne